This article serves as an index - as complete as possible - of all the honorific orders or similar decorations received by the Grand Ducal Family of Luxembourg, classified by continent, awarding country and recipient.

Luxembourgish honours

 Henri, Grand Duke of Luxembourg :
  /  : 
 Co-Grand Master and Knight of the Order of the Gold Lion of the House of Nassau
  : 
 Grand Master and Grand Cross of the military and civil Order of Adolphe of Nassau
 Grand Master and Grand Cross of the Order of the Oak Crown
 Grand Master of the Order of Merit of the Grand Duchy of Luxembourg
 Maria Teresa, Grand Duchess of Luxembourg :
  /  : Knight of the Order of the Gold Lion of the House of Nassau
 Guillaume, Hereditary Grand Duke of Luxembourg : 
  /  : Knight of the Order of the Gold Lion of the House of Nassau (by birth) as a son of one of the 2 Heads of the House
  : Grand Cross of Order of Adolphe of Nassau (by birth, on 18 years old) as Prince of Luxembourg 
  : Grand Cross of Order of the Oak Crown
 Stéphanie, Hereditary Grand Duchess of Luxembourg : Grand Cross of Order of Adolphe of Nassau
 Prince Charles of Luxembourg :
  : Grand Cross of Order of Adolphe of Nassau (by birth, on 18 years old) as Prince of Luxembourg
 Prince Félix of Luxembourg :
  /  : Knight of the Order of the Gold Lion of the House of Nassau (by birth) as a son of one of the 2 Heads 
  : Grand Cross of Order of Adolphe of Nassau (by birth, on 18 years old) as Prince of Luxembourg
 Princess Claire of Luxembourg : Grand Cross of Order of Adolphe of Nassau
 Prince Louis of Luxembourg :
  /  : Knight of the Order of the Gold Lion of the House of Nassau (by birth) as a son of one of the 2 Heads
  : Grand Cross of Order of Adolphe of Nassau (by birth, on 18 years old) as Prince of Luxembourg
 Ms. Tessy Antony-de Nassau : Grand Cross of Order of Adolphe of Nassau (2012)
 Princess Alexandra of Luxembourg :
  /  : Lady of Order of the Gold Lion of the House of Nassau (23/06/2009) as a daughter of one of the 2 Heads
  : Grand Cross of Order of Adolphe of Nassau (by birth, on 18 years old) as Princess of Luxembourg
 Prince Sébastien of Luxembourg :
  /  : Knight of the Order of the Gold Lion of the House of Nassau (by birth) as a son of one of the 2 Heads 
  : Grand Cross of Order of Adolphe of Nassau (by birth, on 18 years old) as Prince of Luxembourg
 Archduchess Marie Astrid of Austria : Grand Cross of Order of Adolphe of Nassau (by birth, on 18 years old) as Princess of Luxembourg
 Archduke Carl Christian of Austria : Grand Cross of Order of Adolphe of Nassau
 Princess Margaretha of Liechtenstein : Grand Cross of Order of Adolphe of Nassau (by birth, on 18 years old) as Princess of Luxembourg
 Prince Nikolaus of Liechtenstein : Grand Cross of the Order of Adolphe of Nassau 
 Prince Jean of Luxembourg :
  /  : Knight of the Order of the Gold Lion of the House of Nassau (by birth) as a son of one of the 2 Heads of the House
  : Grand Cross of Order of Adolphe of Nassau (by birth, on 18 years old) as Prince of Luxembourg
 Prince Guillaume of Luxembourg : 
  /  : Knight of the Order of the Gold Lion of the House of Nassau (by birth) as a son of one of the 2 Heads of the House
  : Grand Cross of Order of Adolphe of Nassau (by birth, on 18 years old) as Prince of Luxembourg
 Princess Sibilla of Luxembourg : Grand Cross of Order of Adolphe of Nassau
 Prince Robert of Luxembourg : Grand Cross of Order of Adolphe of Nassau (by birth, on 18 years old) as Prince of Luxembourg
 Princess Charlotte of Luxembourg : Grand Cross of Order of Adolphe of Nassau (by birth, on 18 years old) as Princess of Luxembourg

European foreign honours

Austria 

 Henri, Grand Duke of Luxembourg : Great Star of Honour for Services to the Republic of Austria (15 April 2013)
 Maria Teresa, Grand Duchess of Luxembourg : Great Star of Honour for Services to the Republic of Austria (15 April 2013)

Belgium 

 Henri, Grand Duke of Luxembourg : Grand Cordon of the Order of Leopold (1994)
 Maria Teresa, Grand Duchess of Luxembourg : Grand Cordon of the Order of Leopold (1994)
 Guillaume, Hereditary Grand Duke of Luxembourg : Grand Cross of the Order of the Crown (2019)
 Stéphanie, Hereditary Grand Duchess of Luxembourg : Grand Cross of the Order of the Crown (2019)
 Prince Guillaume of Luxembourg :  Grand Cross of the Order of the Crown (1994)

Denmark 

 Henri, Grand Duke of Luxembourg : Knight of the Order of the Elephant (20 October 2003)
 Maria Teresa, Grand Duchess of Luxembourg : Knight of the Order of the Elephant (20 October 2003)

Estonia 
 Henri, Grand Duke of Luxembourg : Collar of the Order of the Cross of Terra Mariana (5 May 2003)

Finland 
 Henri, Grand Duke of Luxembourg : Grand Cross with Collar of the Order of the White Rose of Finland (24 November 2008)
 Maria Teresa, Grand Duchess of Luxembourg : Grand Cross of the Order of the White Rose of Finland (24 November 2008)

France

 Henri, Grand Duke of Luxembourg : Grand Cross of the Order of the Legion of Honour
 Maria Teresa, Grand Duchess of Luxembourg : Grand Cross of the Order of the National Merit
 Guillaume, Hereditary Grand Duke of Luxembourg : Grand Officier of the Order of the Legion of Honour

Germany 
 Henry, Grand Duke of Luxembourg: Grand Cross Special Class of the Order of Merit of the Federal Republic of Germany

Greece 
 Henri, Grand Duke of Luxembourg : Grand Cross of the Order of the Redeemer (July 2001)
 Maria Teresa, Grand Duchess of Luxembourg : Grand Cross of the Order of Beneficence (July 2001)

Holy See 
 Henry, Grand Duke of Luxembourg: Knight with the Collar of the Order of Pope Pius IX

Italy 

 Henri, Grand Duke of Luxembourg : Knight Grand Cross with Collar of the Order of Merit of the Italian Republic (14 March 2003)
 Maria Teresa, Grand Duchess of Luxembourg : Knight Grand Cross of the Order of Merit of the Italian Republic (30 January 2009)
 Guillaume, Hereditary Grand Duke of Luxembourg : Knight Grand Cross of the Order of Merit of the Italian Republic (30 January 2009)

Latvia 
 Henri, Grand Duke of Luxembourg : 
 Commander Grand Cross with Chain of the Order of Three Stars (5 December 2006) 
 Recipient of the 1st Class of Cross of Recognition (13 March 2023)
 Maria Teresa, Grand Duchess of Luxembourg : Commander Grand Cross of the Order of Three Stars (5 December 2006)

Liechtenstein 

 Princess Margaretha of Liechtenstein : Knight Grand Cross of the Order of Merit of the Principality of Liechtenstein, Grand Star
 Prince Nikolaus of Liechtenstein: 
 Grand Star of the Order of Merit of the Principality of Liechtenstein, 1st Class
 Recipient of the 70th Birthday Medal of Prince Franz Joseph II

Netherlands 

 Henri, Grand Duke of Luxembourg : 
Grand Cross of the Order of the Crown
 Knight Grand Cross of the Order of the Netherlands Lion (24 April 2006)
 Maria Teresa, Grand Duchess of Luxembourg :
Grand Cross of the Order of the Crown
 Knight Grand Cross of the Order of the Netherlands Lion (24 April 2006)
 Guillaume, Hereditary Grand Duke of Luxembourg : Knight Grand Cross of the Order of Orange-Nassau (21 March 2012)
 Stéphanie, Hereditary Grand Duchess of Luxembourg : Knight Grand Cross of the Order of Orange-Nassau (23 May 2018)

Norway 
 Henri, Grand Duke of Luxembourg : Grand Cross with Collar of the Order of St. Olav (1996)
 Maria Teresa, Grand Duchess of Luxembourg : Grand Cross of the Order of St. Olav (1996)

Poland 
 Henry, Grand Duke of Luxembourg: Knight of the Order of the White Eagle

Portugal 

 Henri, Grand Duke of Luxembourg :
 Grand Collar of the Order of Prince Henry (6 May 2005)
 Grand Collar of the Order of Saint James of the Sword (7 September 2010)
 Grand Collar of the Order of Liberty (23 May 2017)
 Grand Collar of the Military Order of Christ (11 May 2022)
 Maria Teresa, Grand Duchess of Luxembourg :
 Grand Cross of the Order of Christ (6 May 2005)
 Grand Cross of the Order of Saint James of the Sword (7 September 2010)
 Grand Cross of the Order of Prince Henry (23 May 2017)
 Grand Cross of the Order of Camões (11 May 2022)
  House of Braganza : Honorary Grand Cross of the Order of Saint Isabel (27 October 2012)
 Guillaume, Hereditary Grand Duke of Luxembourg: Grand Cross of the Order of Aviz (23 May 2017)
 Stéphanie, Hereditary Grand Duchess of Luxembourg: Grand Cross of the Order of Merit (23 May 2017)
 Princess Margaretha of Liechtenstein : 
  House of Braganza : Honorary Grand Cross of the Order of Saint Isabel (27 October 2012)

Romania 

 Henri, Grand Duke of Luxembourg : Collar of the Order of the Star of Romania (2004)
 Maria Teresa, Grand Duchess of Luxembourg : Grand Cross of the Order of the Star of Romania (2004)

Slovakia 

 Henri, Grand Duke of Luxembourg: Grand Cross (or 1st Class) of the Order of the White Double Cross (2002)
 Guillaume, Hereditary Grand Duke of Luxembourg: Grand Officer (or 2nd Class) of the Order of the White Double Cross (7 September 2005)

Spain 

 Henri, Grand Duke of Luxembourg: 
 Knight of the Order of the Golden Fleece (13/04/2007)
 Grand Cross (08/07/1980) with Collar of the Order of Charles III (11/05/2001)
 Maria Teresa, Grand Duchess of Luxembourg : Grand Cross of the Order of Charles III (11/05/2001)
 Archduchess Marie Astrid of Austria : Grand Cross of the Order of Isabella the Catholic (08/07/1980)
 Princess Margaretha of Liechtenstein : Grand Cross of the Order of Isabella the Catholic (08/07/1980)
 Prince Jean of Luxembourg : Grand Cross of the Order of Isabella the Catholic (08/07/1980)
 Prince Guillaume of Luxembourg : Grand Cross of the Order of Isabella the Catholic (08/07/1980)

Sweden 

 Henri, Grand Duke of Luxembourg : Knight with Collar of the Order of the Seraphim (12 September 1983)
 Maria Teresa, Grand Duchess of Luxembourg : Member of the Order of the Seraphim (15 April 2008)

Turkey 
 Henri, Grand Duke of Luxembourg : Knight of the Order of the State of Republic of Turkey (19 November 2013)

United Kingdom 

 Henri, Grand Duke of Luxembourg :
Honorary Knight Grand Cross of the Royal Victorian Order (1976)
Recipient of the Sandhurst Medal (22 September 2020)
 Guillaume, Hereditary Grand Duke of Luxembourg:
Recipient of the Sandhurst Medal (22 September 2020)

International sovereign organisations

 Henri, Grand Duke of Luxembourg :
  : Bailiff Grand Cross of Honour and Devotion of the Sovereign Military Order of Malta

Former Sovereign families
 Henri, Grand Duke of Luxembourg :
: Supreme Knight of the Order of the Most Holy Annunciation
 Knight Grand Cross of the Order of Saints Maurice and Lazarus
 Knight Grand Cross of the Order of the Crown of Italy

American foreign honours

Brazil 
 Henri, Grand Duke of Luxembourg : Grand Collar of the Order of the Southern Cross (3 December 2007)
 Maria Teresa, Grand Duchess of Luxembourg : Grand Cross of the Order of the Southern Cross (3 December 2007)

African foreign honours

Cape Verde
 Henri, Grand Duke of Luxembourg : Member 1st Class of the Amílcar Cabral Order (12 March 2015)

Mali 
 Henri, Grand Duke of Luxembourg : Grand Cross of the National Order of Mali (9 November 2005)

Senegal
Henri, Grand Duke of Luxembourg : Grand Cross of the National Order of the Lion (21 January 2018)
Guillaume, Hereditary Grand Duke of Luxembourg : Commandeur of the National Order of the Lion (24 February 2023)

Asian foreign honours

Japan
 Henri, Grand Duke of Luxembourg : Collar of the Supreme Order of the Chrysanthemum (27 November 2017)
 Maria Teresa, Grand Duchess of Luxembourg : Gran Cordon (Paulownia) of the Order of the Precious Crown (27 November 2017)
 Princess Alexandra of Luxembourg : Second Class (Peony) of the Order of the Precious Crown (27 November 2017)

References

Orders, decorations, and medals of Luxembourg
Luxembourg